The Cilley Covered Bridge is a historic 19th-century covered bridge, carrying Howe Lane across the First Branch White River a short way south of the village of Tunbridge, Vermont.  Built in 1883, it is a fine example of a king-post truss structure, and is one of the town's five 19th-century covered bridges.  It was listed on the National Register of Historic Places in 1974.

Description and history
It carries Howe Lane, a side loop off Vermont Route 110, across the First Branch White River. The bridge is set on abutments of stone, one of which has been faced in concrete, and is covered in vertical board siding and a metal roof. The south side of the bridge has two square window holes, which improve visibility due to a sharp turn in the road at one end. The trusses are set at a skew, giving the bridge the shape of a parallelogram. The portals are square, and the exterior sheathing extends around to the ends of the trusses on the interior.

The bridge was built in 1883, and has been little altered since then.  It is one of six bridges in a  stretch of the First Branch White River, representing one of the highest concentrations of covered bridges in the state.

See also
List of Vermont covered bridges
National Register of Historic Places listings in Orange County, Vermont
List of bridges on the National Register of Historic Places in Vermont

References

External links

Covered bridges on the National Register of Historic Places in Vermont
National Register of Historic Places in Orange County, Vermont
Bridges completed in 1883
Covered bridges in Orange County, Vermont
Buildings and structures in Tunbridge, Vermont
Road bridges on the National Register of Historic Places in Vermont
Wooden bridges in Vermont
King post truss bridges in the United States
1883 establishments in Vermont